Manjunath is another name for the Hindu deity Shiva. It may also refer to:

People
 B. C. Manjunath, Indian classical musician/percussionist
 Shanmugam Manjunath (1978–2005), Indian marketing manager murdered for his stand against corruption
 Mysore Manjunath, Indian violinist
 Master Manjunath (Manjunath Nayaker) (born 1976), an Indian actor and public relations professional
 Manjunath Kunnur, former MP of Dharwad South

Other
 Manjunath (film), a 2014 Indian drama film
 Sri Manjunatha (film), a 2001 Indian film
 Dharmasthala Temple, a temple in Dharmasthala, Karnataka
 Kadri Manjunath Temple, in Mangalore

See also
 
 Manjunatha, or Shiva